Satyajit Sudhir Parab (born 1 September 1975 in Vadodara, Gujarat, India), is an Indian cricketer who played first-class and professional cricket for 14 years representing India A, Board President‘s XI, India Seniors, West Zone and Baroda.

Parab, primarily an opening, right-hand batsman, played 84 first-class matches and 35 List A matches. Over these matches, Parab accumulated over 6,000 runs including 17 centuries and 23 half-centuries. In 2000-01, when Baroda won the Ranji Trophy, Parab scored 809 runs at an average of 58, and followed that with 895 runs at 56 in 2002-03.

Parab now works in cricket operations and development and has worked with Baroda Cricket Association and Team India.

References

External links

Living people
1975 births
Baroda cricketers
People from Vadodara